Forgotten Light is a 1996 Czech film directed by Vladimír Michálek. The screenplay by Czech-American Milena Jelinek is based on a 1934 book by Jakub Deml which is considered a masterpiece of Czech literature of the 20th century. The film was the Czech Republic's submission to the 70th Academy Awards for the Academy Award for Best Foreign Language Film, but was not accepted as a nominee.

The protagonist is Father Holý, a village priest, who battles the state and religious bureaucracies of 1980s Czechoslovakia to raise money for a new church roof. Permeated by his love for the villagers, his encounters are marked by his good humor. In his losing battle against Church and State, Holý is ordered transferred away from his parish and his allies.

Cast
 Bolek Polívka as Vicar Holý
 Veronika Žilková as Marjánka
 Petr Kavan as Francek
 Jiří Pecha as Klíma
 Antonín Kinský as Count Kinský
 Jiří Lábus as Vicar Kubišta
 Richard Metznarowski as Chapter's Vicar

See also
 Cinema of the Czech Republic
 List of submissions to the 70th Academy Awards for Best Foreign Language Film
 List of Czech submissions for the Academy Award for Best Foreign Language Film

References

External links

1996 films
1996 drama films
Czech drama films
1990s Czech-language films
Czech Lion Awards winners (films)